The Gypsy is a 1975  French-Italian crime-drama film written and directed by José Giovanni. It is based on Giovanni's novel Histoire de fou.

It recorded admissions of 1,788,111 in France.

Plot

Cast 
 Alain Delon as Hugo Sennart, aka Le Gitan 
 Annie Girardot as  Ninie
 Paul Meurisse  as  Yan Kuq
 Marcel Bozzuffi as  Blot 
 Bernard Giraudeau as Mareuil
 Renato Salvatori as  Jo Amila
  Maurice Barrier as  Jacques Helman
 Maurice Biraud  as  Pierrot le Naïf
  Michel Fortin as  Marcel
 Jacques Rispal  as  The Veterinary
 Florence Giorgetti  as Ninie's servant
 Nicolas Vogel as Jeannot

References

External links
 
 
 

1975 films
Films about Romani people
Films about bank robbery
Films based on works by José Giovanni
Films based on French novels
Films directed by José Giovanni
Films produced by Alain Delon
Films with screenplays by José Giovanni
French crime drama films
Films scored by Claude Bolling
1970s French-language films
1970s French films
Italian crime drama films
1970s Italian films
1975 crime drama films